Cismadinone (INN), also known as 6α-chloro-17α-hydroxypregna-1,4-diene-3,20-dione or 6α-chloro-δ1-dehydro-17α-hydroxyprogesterone, is a steroidal progestin closely related to the 17α-hydroxyprogesterone derivatives that was never marketed. An acetylated form, cismadinone acetate, also exists, but similarly to cismadinone, was never marketed.

References

Organochlorides
Pregnanes
Progestogens
Abandoned drugs